Francis Knapp (1672–1717) was an Anglican priest  in Ireland during the 18th century.

Knapp was born in Chilton, Berkshire and educated at St John's College, Oxford. He was Dean of Killala from 1701 until his death.

Notes

Alumni of St John's College, Oxford
18th-century Irish Anglican priests
Deans of Killala
1717 deaths
1672 births
People from Vale of White Horse (district)